Chamoun, Chamun or Shamoun (Syriac: ܫܡܥܘܢ; Arabic: شمعون), is an Aramaic given name and family name and a variant of Symeon and Shimun.

Notable persons with that surname include:

List of persons with the surname

Chamoun family

Camille Chamoun (1900–1987), Lebanese politician, President of Lebanon from 1952 to 1958
Dany Chamoun (1934–1990), Lebanese politician, son of Camille Chamoun
Dory Chamoun (born 1931), Lebanese politician, son of Camille Chamoun
Tracy Chamoun (born 1962), Lebanese-Australian author and political activist, daughter of Dany Chamoun

Other persons
Chaouki Chamoun (born 1942), Lebanese artist
Jackie Chamoun (born 1991), Lebanese alpine skier
Nawfal Shamoun (born 1968), Iraqi singer of Assyrian origin
Sami Chamoun, Australian-born rugby league player of Lebanese origin
Takla Chamoun (born 1966)، Lebanese Actress
Fayrouz Chamoun, Lebanese Artist, Painter and Writer based in Zahle, Lebanon

List of persons with the given name
 Shamoun Hanna Haydo (before 1914–1963), Assyrian military leader

See also
Simeon, also Shimun
Shimun (disambiguation), also Shemon
Simon (disambiguation) 

Given names
Surnames
Arabic-language surnames
Lebanese families